The 31st European Film Awards were presented on 15 December 2018 in Seville, Spain.

Selection

 3 Days in Quiberon
 Ága
 Anna's War
 Arrhythmia
 Ayka
 Beast
 Border
 Borg/McEnroe
 Carmen & Lola
 Cobain
 Cold War
 Custody
 Diamantino
 Dogman
 Donbass
 Dovlatov
 Foxtrot
 Fugue
 Girl
 Happy as Lazzaro
 Longing
 Mademoiselle Paradis
 Men Don't Cry
 Michael Inside
 Milada
 Mug
 One Day
 Paddington 2
 Petra
 Pity
 Pomegranate Orchard
 Pororoca
 Scary Mother
 Shock Waves – Diary of My Mind
 Styx
 The Captain
 Giant
 The Guilty
 The House by the Sea
 The House That Jack Built
 Summer
 The Wild Pear Tree
 Those Who Are Fine
 Touch Me Not
 Transit
 Utøya: July 22
 Under the Tree
 What Will People Say
 Woman at War

Awards voted by EFA Members

Best Film
The nominees were announced on 10 November 2018.

Best Comedy

Best Director

Best Screenwriter

Best Actress

Best Actor

Technical awards

Best Composer

Best Cinematographer

Best Editor

Best Production Designer

Best Costume Designer

Best Sound Designer

Best Makeup and Hairstyling

Best Visual Effects

Critics Award

European Discovery

Best Animated Feature Film

Audience awards

People's Choice Award

University Award

Best Documentary

Best Short Film

European Co-Production Award — Prix Eurimages

Honorary Awards

European Achievement in World Cinema

Lifetime Achievement Award

References

External links 
 

2018 film awards
2018 in Andalusia
December 2018 events in Spain 
European Film Awards ceremonies
History of Seville